Organ Pipe Cliffs is a line of coastal cliffs in the form of palisades of columnar dolerite overlooking the sea to the west of Cape Wild. Discovered by the Australasian Antarctic Expedition (1911–14) under Douglas Mawson, who named them because of the similarity of the rock structure to organ pipes..

Landforms
 Cape Blake
 Cape Wild

References

Cliffs of Antarctica
Landforms of George V Land